See Black Dome for other mountains of this name.

Black Dome is a mountain located in Greene County, New York. 
The mountain is the highest peak of the Blackhead Mountains range of the Catskills.
Black Dome is flanked to the east by Blackhead, and to the west by Thomas Cole Mountain.

Black Dome stands within the watershed of Schoharie Creek, which drains into the Mohawk River, the Hudson River, and into New York Bay.
The south side of Black Dome drains into East Kill, and thence into Schoharie Creek.
The north side of Black Dome drains into Batavia Kill, and thence into Schoharie Creek.

Black Dome is within New York's Catskill Park.

See also 
 List of mountains in New York
 Catskill High Peaks
 Catskill Mountain 3500 Club

References

External links 
 
 

Mountains of Greene County, New York
Catskill High Peaks
Mountains of New York (state)